Buck v. Gallagher, 307 U.S. 95 (1939), was a United States Supreme Court case in which the Court had two main holdings. First, ASCAP members have a common and undivided interest in the right to license in association through the Society free of the state statute. Second, the lower court should have allowed ASCAP members the opportunity to price the cost of complying with the statute and the value of the copyrights affected by it.

References

External links
 

1939 in United States case law
United States copyright case law
United States Supreme Court cases
United States Supreme Court cases of the Hughes Court